Calliotropis philippei is a species of sea snail, a marine gastropod mollusk in the family Eucyclidae.

Description
The size of the shell varies between 18 mm and 22 mm.

Distribution
This marine species occurs off the Philippines.

References

 Vilvens C. (2007) New records and new species of Calliotropis from Indo-Pacific. Novapex 8 (Hors Série 5): 1–72.

External links
 

philippei
Gastropods described in 2006